Nick Ienatsch (last name pronounced "Eye-Notch", born 1961 in Eau Claire, Wisconsin) is an American motorcycle racer, writer, and motorcycle riding instructor.

Racing
ARRA #1 plate at Willow Springs Raceway 1989, 1990

WERA Grand National Finals champion in three classes: 1989

AMA 250GP #2 and #3 plate holder: 1991, 1993, 1994, 1995

AMA Superteams #1 plate with Two Brothers Racing, 1993, Erion Racing 1994; #2 plate with Dutchman Racing 1995 

AMA 600 Supersport podium finisher, Sears Point; Daytona

AHRMA winner on TZ750, NSR250, GPz550, KZ1000 currently

AMA/Dragbike ProStreet World Finals winner at Valdosta, GA 2008 

FIM-certified runs over 200 mph during magazine testing with a best of 234

Motorcycle schools
Ienatsch was the lead instructor for twelve years at Freddie Spencer Riding School. He later created and is lead instructor at Yamaha Champions Riding School.

Writing
Ienatsch has written for Motorcyclist (1984–??) Sport Rider where he was founding editor (ca. 1985–1996) and Cycle World (1997–2012).

He is also author of the 2003 book Sport Riding Techniques and the 2017 novel The Hill Ranch Racers.

In 1999 he was the founding editor of MotoGP.com, through 2001.

Wrote The Pace and The Pace 2.0, The Brake Light Initiative 

He writes for CycleWorld.com on a weekly basis.

Bibliography

Nick Ienatsch (2016). The Hill Ranch Racers novel. Outskirts Press.

References

External links
Yamaha Champions Riding School
Cycleworld.com

Living people
Sportspeople from Eau Claire, Wisconsin
People from Utah
Motorcycling writers
Motorcycle journalists
Motorcycle trainers
1960s births